Fred Okengo Matiang'i is a former Kenyan Cabinet Secretary. He served as the Cabinet Secretary for the Ministry of Interior  and Coordination of National Government in Kenya. He assumed office on 8 July 2017 on acting capacity after the sudden Demise of Joseph ole Nkaissery, making him hold two cabinet positions concurrently, that is in the ministry of Interior  and Coordination of National Government and  Education, Science and Technology. He took up the full position of cabinet secretary for Internal Security and Coordination of National Government after being appointed by President Uhuru Kenyatta in January 2018 in the president's second comprehensive cabinet appointments. On 22 January 2019, President Uhuru Kenyatta, through Executive Order Number 1 of 2019, appointed him chairperson of the National Development Implementation and Communication Cabinet Committee. The committee is composed of all Cabinet Secretaries, The Attorney-General and the Head of the Public Service who acts as the secretariat.

Matiang'i had served as the Eastern Africa regional representative for the Centre for International Development, Rockefeller College of Public Affairs and Policy, the State University of New York before being nominated as the Cabinet Secretary for Information Communication and Technology on 23 April 2013.

He formerly taught at Egerton University and the University of Nairobi.

On 24 November 2015, President Uhuru Kenyatta, in a cabinet reshuffle, appointed him as the cabinet secretary for Education.

Cabinet Secretary for Education, Science and Technology 
Matiangi was appointed as the Cabinet Secretary for education, Science and Technology in December 2015 having previously been in acting capacity as the Cabinet Secretary for lands. His appointment came at a time the education sector had seen massive leakages in the just concluded Kenya Certificate of Secondary Education national examinations.

Within a short period of time at the helm of the ministry, he sent home officials from the examining body KNEC and restructured the security procedures surrounding the handling of the exam papers. Policies he put into place regarding the examination of the national Secondary and Primary examinations were
 Headteachers were now directly in charge of examinations carried out in their examination Centre instead of the County education officer as had been the case before.
 Social activities were banned in the third term of the school calendar in order to reduce unnecessary contact between the exam candidates and outsiders.
 The maximum duration in which the KCSE examination could be carried out was limited to four weeks from the initial six.
 Results from the Kenya Certificate of Secondary Education national examination were now released in one month down from the three months that it took before. This was to eliminate the possibility of alteration of result by rogue officials.

Relationship with Teacher’s Unions 
Matiangi's relationship with KNUT and KUPPET was generally seen as a love hate kind of relationship. This was essentially due to the "bulldozing’ nature of Matiangi while working in the ministry of education. After the results on the 2016 KCSE the Kenya National Union of teachers demanded a forensic audit of the examination results after a dismal performance led to quite a steep decline in the number of students achieving top grades. This was though attributed to the hard hitting changes that Matiangi had introduced to the ministry less than a year after joining it.

Cabinet Secretary for Interior and Coordination of National Government 
After the death of Joseph Ole Nkaissery on 8 July 2017, Matiangi was appointed in acting capacity as the Cabinet Secretary  for Interior and Coordination of National Government. He was given this post courtesy of his track record as a ‘fix it man’  for the President in terms of getting things done. This was as a result of his tenure at the Ministry of Information Communication and Technology in which he ensured that the country had gone through the phase of digital migration despite protest from broadcasters and controversies surrounding the award of frequencies and tenders of the same. Also while at the helm of the ministry of education his work in securing the national examinations earned him accolades throughout the country and the executive.

Matiangi received general public backlash over the government's decision to shut down media houses during the swearing-in of Raila Odinga by his supporters as the People's President. On the day of the swearing in, 3 radio and television broadcasting stations were switched off by the Communications Authority of Kenya by a directive from the Ministry of Interior. In a televised broadcast the following day, Matiangi indicated that the broadcasting stations would remain off for the better part up until they had completed investigations into some people that he accused of being complicit in actions that would have led to the death of thousands of innocent Kenyans due to the buildup of incitement that was witnessed in the early hours of the morning of 30th January 2018

Relationship with the opposition 
Matiangi while occupying one of the highest dockets a public civil servant can hold, has not been short of conflicts with the opposition. During the 2017 Kenya presidential election, Matiangi took a hard stance against the opposition protests aimed at the Independent Electoral and Boundaries Commission. His ministry, of which the national police falls under would clash with the opposition violently during their demonstrations.

After the swearing in of Raila Odinga in January 2018, Matiangi outlawed the National Resistance Movement, gazetting the movement as an organised criminal sect. Following this, the Cabinet Secretary indicated that

Following his press briefing, officers from the Flying Squad picked up some individuals aligned to the opposition and some media personalities for questioning regarding their association with the swearing in of Raila Odinga the day before. The individuals picked up were Member of Parliament for Ruaraka TJ Kajwang, Miguna Miguna, Linus Kaikai and Larry Madowo.

References 

Living people
Kenyatta University alumni
University of Nairobi alumni
People from Nyamira County
Kisii
Government ministers of Kenya
Year of birth missing (living people)